A Costa Rican passport is an identity document issued to Costa Rican citizens to travel outside Costa Rica. Currently, it is valid for 6 years (10 years before 2006). It is issued to people born on Costa Rican soil (who are citizens by default), and to children of Costa Rican citizens born abroad, who are reported to the nearest Costa Rican consulate (whose birth, immediately after such report, is recorded in the civil registry). Children born overseas to a Costa Rican citizen are Costa Rican by birth, not by naturalisation, as stated in the Constitution of Costa Rica.

As of 1 October 2019, Costa Rican citizens had visa-free or visa on arrival access to 150 countries and territories, ranking the Costa Rican passport 27th overall and first among Central American countries, in terms of travel freedom according to the Henley Passport Index.

In 2017, the Costa Rican government confirmed plans to begin issuing biometric passports by 2020. Due to the COVID-19 Pandemic the government of Costa Rica postponed the plans until 2022.

As of early 2022 the Costa Rican government began issuing the new biometric passports. The new passports showcase four important elements of the country: Biodiversity, Renewable Energy, Education and Peace, and Talent.

Appearance
It is dark blue on the outside, with letters and the Costa Rican coat of arms in gilded-looking letters.

Gallery of historic images

See also
List of passports
Visa requirements for Costa Rican citizens

External links
 Images of a 1980 Costa Rican passport from www.passportland.com

References

Government of Costa Rica
Passports by country